Hadyard Hill Wind Farm is located in Carrick district of South Ayrshire. Costing £85 million, the wind farm consists of 52 three-bladed Siemens wind turbines, each capable of generating 2.3 megawatts (MW) of power, giving a total output of 120 MW.  This was Britain's most powerful wind farm when it was commissioned in March 2006.

The diameter of the blades is 80 metres (262 feet) and each turbine is mounted on tubular steel towers. The wind farm includes three permanent 60 metres (197-feet) high anemometer towers to monitor wind speeds, and is connected by a high-voltage overhead transmission line, which connects to the national electricity network at Maybole.

The farm is operated by Scottish and Southern Energy Generation Ltd.

See also

 Wind power in Scotland
 List of onshore wind farms
 Operational wind farms

References

Wind farms in Scotland
Buildings and structures in South Ayrshire